Sotheby's is a British-founded American multinational corporation with headquarters in New York City. It is one of the world's largest brokers of fine and decorative art, jewellery, and collectibles. It has 80 locations in 40 countries, and maintains a significant presence in the UK.

Sotheby's was established on 11 March 1744 in London by Samuel Baker, a bookseller. In 1767 the firm became Baker & Leigh, after George Leigh became a partner, and was renamed to Leigh and Sotheby in 1778 after Baker's death when Leigh's nephew, John Sotheby, inherited Leigh's share. Other former names include: Leigh, Sotheby and Wilkinson;  Sotheby, Wilkinson and Hodge (1864–1924); Sotheby and Company (1924–83); Mssrs Sotheby; Sotheby & Wilkinson; Sotheby Mak van Waay; and Sotheby's & Co.

The American holding company was initially incorporated in August 1983 in Michigan as Sotheby's Holdings, Inc. In June 2006, it was reincorporated in the State of Delaware and was renamed Sotheby's. In July 2016, Chinese insurance company Taikang Life became Sotheby's largest shareholder. In June 2019, Sotheby's announced that it was being acquired by French-Israeli businessman Patrick Drahi at a 61% market premium. 

Sotheby's Institute of Art (an educational facility), Sotheby's International Realty (real estate dealers), and RM Sotheby's (classic car dealers) are subsidiaries or partner organisations.

History

Beginnings (18th & 19th century)

Sotheby's was established on 11 March 1744 in London by Samuel Baker, a bookseller. In 1767 the firm became Baker & Leigh, after Samuel Baker auctioned several hundred valuable books from the library of The Rt Hon Sir John Stanley, 1st Baronet, of Grangegorman and became business partners with George Leigh. The library Napoleon took with him into exile at St Helena, as well as the library collections of John Wilkes, Benjamin Heywood Bright and the Dukes of Devonshire and of Buckingham (both related to George Leigh), were sold through Samuel Baker's auctions.

After Baker's death in 1778, the business was left to Leigh and his nephew John Sotheby, where it became a prominent book auction house and was renamed Leigh and Sotheby.

George Leigh died in 1816, but not before recruiting Samuel E Leigh into the business. Under the Sotheby family, the auction house extended its activities to auctioning prints, medals, and coins. John Wilkinson, Sotheby's Senior Accountant, became a partner and eventually the company's new head of the company when the last member of the Sotheby family died in 1861.

20th century

The business did not seek to auction fine arts initially. Their first major success in this field was the sale of a Frans Hals painting for nine thousand guineas in 1913.
Other former names include: Leigh, Sotheby and Wilkinson;  Sotheby, Wilkinson and Hodge (1864–1924); Sotheby and Company (1924–83); Mssrs Sotheby; Sotheby & Wilkinson; Sotheby Mak van Waay; and Sotheby's & Co. In 1917, Sotheby's relocated from 13 Wellington Street to 34–35 New Bond Street, which remains as its London base to this day. They soon came to rival Christie's as leaders of the London auction market, which capitalised on the arts. In 1964, Sotheby's purchased Parke-Bernet, the largest auctioneer of fine art in the United States at the time. In the following year, Sotheby's moved to 980 Madison Avenue, New York. With the international fine art auction industry growing, Sotheby's opened offices in Paris and Los Angeles in 1967, and became the first auction house to operate in Hong Kong in 1973, and Moscow in 1988.

As well as numerous high-profile real life auctions being held at Sotheby's, the firm's auctioneers have also been used in various films, including the 1983 James Bond film Octopussy.

With private transactions constituting an essential and increasingly profitable business segment, through the years Sotheby's has bought art galleries and helped dealers finance purchases. It has also gone into partnership with dealers on private sales. In 1990, Sotheby's teamed up with dealer William Acquavella, to form Acquavella Modern Art, a Nevada general partnership and a subsidiary of Sotheby's Holding Company. The subsidiary paid $143 million for the contents of the Pierre Matisse Gallery in Manhattan, which included about 2,300 works by such artists as Miró, Jean Dubuffet, Alberto Giacometti, and Marc Chagall, and began selling the works both at auction and privately. In 1996, Sotheby's acquired Andre Emmerich Gallery to operate a division called Emmerich/Sotheby's, and in 1997 it purchased a 50% interest in Deitch Projects. As a consequence, the Josef and Anni Albers Foundation, the main beneficiary of the artists' estates, as well as the estates of Morris Louis and Milton Avery announced that they would not renew their Emmerich contracts. That decision came right after it was disclosed that Sotheby's had decided to close Emmerich's prime space at 41 East 57th Street, and that its artists would be handled out of Deitch Projects. Sotheby's subsequently closed Andre Emmerich in 1998 and later sold its share in Deitch Projects back to Jeffrey Deitch. In 2006, Sotheby's acquired a Dutch dealership, Noortman Master Paintings, from its owner, Robert Noortman, for $82.5 million ($56.5 million worth of Sotheby's stock and assumption of more than $26 million in gallery debt, including $11.7 million owed to the auction house). Sotheby's and Noortman had collaborated before in 1995, when the sales of Dutch plastic millionaire Joost Ritman were divided between the two companies. Already in 1990, Sotheby's New York had successfully lobbied for a zoning change permitting the construction of a 27-story residential tower above the five-story headquarters; this expansion was never realised. Instead, Sotheby's throughout the 1990s expressed interest in sites that ranged from the old Alexander's building on East 59th Street to the New York Coliseum site on Columbus Circle, and was even considering moving into the old B. Altman Building on Fifth Avenue.

21st century

The company eventually bought its York Avenue building for $11 million in 2000 and completed a $140 million expansion and renovation in 2001, adding six floors and 240,000 square feet. The renovation added the capability to store works on the same premises as the specialist departments, galleries, and auction spaces. Sotheby's New York's offices also house Sotheby's Wine and the former Bid (an American contemporary restaurant and later bistro), which was closed due to poor attendance. The company sold the building in 2002 for $175 million. In May 2007, Sotheby's opened an office in Moscow in response to rapidly growing interest among Russian buyers in the international art market and held sales in Qatar in 2009.

As many industries took a blow from the economic crisis of 2008, the art market also saw a contraction. In international figures, art prices fell by 7.5% in Q1 of 2008 in comparison to the previous quarter. In September and October 2008, major auction houses saw a sharp decline in sales: artprice.com, the world leader in art market information, coined the term "Black October". Sotheby's bought-in rate was 27%, Christie's was 45% and Phillips de Pury's was 46%. However, the total values of global and United States Fine Art auction sales were US$8.3 billion and US$2.9 billion, respectively. In 2009, art collector Steven A. Cohen built a 6 percent stake in the auction house for his hedge fund SAC Capital Advisors.

In 2011, Noortman's Amsterdam space was closed and the gallery moved to London. Two years later, Sotheby's closed Noortmans, after having written down $8.3 million of inventory and started selling off lower-valued works of art through other auction houses. , Sotheby's is present in over 40 countries, with 80 locations. In 2012, the company signed a 10-year joint-venture agreement to form Sotheby's (Beijing) Auction Co. Ltd., the first international auction house in China; under the agreement, it invested $1.2 million to take an 80 percent stake in the venture with state-owned Beijing Gehua Cultural Development Group.

As of 2012, the firm had an annual revenue of approximately US$831.8 million and offices on Manhattan's York Avenue and London's New Bond Street.

Sotheby's shares a rivalry with Christie's for the position of the world's pre-eminent fine art auctioneer, a title of much subjectivity. In August 2004, Sotheby's introduced an online system – MySotheby's – allowing clients to track lots and create "wishlists" that could be automatically updated as new works became available. Sotheby's also created the BIDnow service, which allows bidders to bid real-time online while watching the broadcast auctions, with the exception of Wine auctions. LiveBid is Sotheby's online bidding system exclusively for wine auctions. 

In the meantime, income from classic auctioneering has fallen, as Sotheby's reported a decrease of 42% in net income in the first half of 2012.

In February 2015 Sotheby's acquired a 25% stake in classic and vintage automobile auctioneer RM Auctions.

On 17 March 2015, it was announced that Tad Smith, former president and chief executive of New York's Madison Square Garden, would succeed William F. Ruprecht as CEO of Sotheby's. Smith had no experience in the auction industry but had overseen a doubling of profits during his time at Madison Square Garden. In 2015, the auction house's longest serving auctioneer, David Redden, and Vice-Chairman retired.

In 2016, the company spent sent shockwaves through the trade after spending $50 million on Art Agency Partners, run by Amy Cappellazzo, Allan Schwartzman and Adam Chinn. The price was shared among the trio, as well as $35 million performance-related bonus. The five year contract expired in 2021.

On 25 January 2018, Sotheby's acquired the AI company Thread Genius for an undisclosed amount.

In February 2019, Sotheby's announced a redesign and expansion of its New York headquarters on the Upper East Side that is being led by the designer Shohei Shigematsu of the Office for Metropolitan Architecture (OMA). The exhibition space there will grow to over 90,000 square feet from 67,000, and the project will include the addition of several new galleries.

In 2019, Sotheby's introduced an online valuations platform to their website to facilitate the provision of estimates.  

In June 2019, Sotheby's announced that it was being acquired by French-Israeli businessman Patrick Drahi at a 61% market premium. On 28 October 2019, Sotheby's named Charles F. Stewart as their new CEO. Sotheby's former CEO Tad Smith transitioned to an advisory role.

In 2020, Sotheby’s overtook Christie’s as the world’s top auction house for the first time since 2011, with over $5 billion in aggregate sales compared to its rival’s $4.4 billion.

As of late 2021, Drahi’s son, Nathan Drahi, is the managing director of Sotheby’s Asia.

Public trading

Sotheby's became a UK public company in 1977. In 1980, after a drop in sales, Sotheby's relocated its North American headquarters from Madison Avenue to a former cigar factory at 1334 York Avenue, New York. The auction house closed its Madison Avenue galleries at East 76th Street. The Los Angeles galleries were sold and West Coast auctions moved to New York.

The following year, a group of investors (including American millionaire Alfred Taubman) purchased and privatized Sotheby's. Sotheby's was initially incorporated as Sotheby's Holdings, Inc. in Michigan in August 1983. In 1988, Taubman took Sotheby's public and listed the company's shares on the New York Stock Exchange, making Sotheby's the oldest publicly traded company on the NYSE under the ticker symbol "BID". In June 2006, Sotheby's Holdings, Inc. reincorporated in the State of Delaware and was renamed Sotheby's shortly after.

After Sotheby’s was acquired & taken private by Patrick Drahi for $3.7 billion in 2019, the company is no longer available for public trading on the New York Stock Exchange.

Auction process

Sotheby's auctions are usually held during the day. The majority are free and open to the public, with the exception of occasional evening auctions, which require tickets. Attendees have no obligation to bid.

Bidding finishes when only one bidder remains willing to purchase the lot at the bidder's declared price. The auctioneer "knocks down" the lot, declaring it sold to the winning bidder. The winning bid for a lot is also called the hammer price. Sotheby's organises the delivery of the lot in private with the buyer.

Buying
Buyers can find out what is for sale at Sotheby's by browsing e-catalogues, visiting pre-sale exhibitions, purchasing print catalogues and registering for e-mail alerts. Buyers can register to bid in person at Sotheby's offices, or online. Sotheby's requires that prospective buyers provide government-issued proof of identity and sometimes a bank reference. There are four ways buyers can bid: in person at the auction rooms, by telephone, bid live online or make an absentee bid online. When a bid is successful, Sotheby's calculates and sums the hammer price, the buyer's premium and taxes.

Selling
Sellers are required to submit an Auction Estimate Form, providing thorough information and a photograph of the item. Once accepted for auction, the seller and Sotheby's sign a contract, which sets out the reserve price and the seller's commission. If bidding on a seller's lot does not reach the reserve price, the item is not sold.

Service categories

, Sotheby's lists the following services:

Advisory
Fiduciary client group
Global partnerships
Financial services/lending
Fine art storage
Post sale services
Private sales
Restitution
Scientific research
Tax, heritage and UK museums
Valuations
Wine advisory services

Private sales
Sotheby's links sellers with prospective buyers in private if sellers do not want a public auction. The identities of buyers and consignors are not disclosed. Sotheby's Private Sales works with clients with confidentiality and tailors the buying and selling process in a private setting. Private Sales accounted for 16.5% of all Sotheby's sales in 2011. That year, Sotheby's inaugurated a new gallery space called S2 at its York Avenue headquarters with a show of work by American abstract painter Sam Francis. Unlike Haunch of Venison, a gallery that Christie's bought in 2007, S2 is solely devoted to showcasing the auction house's private sales. In 2013, Sotheby's opened a gallery for private sales close to its branch in London, in a five-story block at 31 George Street. The auction house also conducts private sales through its selling exhibitions of monumental sculpture at Chatsworth House, Derbyshire, and at the Singapore Botanic Gardens.

Financial services
Established in 1988, Sotheby's Financial Services offers loans for consigned property and loans against the value of client's items through customized terms. The auction house also makes term loans, for a defined period of time, on works that clients aren't planning to sell, in part to "establish or enhance mutually beneficial relationships with borrowers" that can lead to future consignments. While traditional lenders such as banks provide loans at a lower cost to borrowers, Sotheby's said in its 2011 annual report, few will accept works of art as the sole collateral.

Picture library
Sotheby's Picture Library contained images in a variety of formats available for licensing, and was one of the image suppliers to various databases such as the British Association of Picture Libraries and Agencies (BAPLA). However, only the image archive mentioned on the Sotheby's website  is an out-of-date reference to the Cecil Beaton Studio Archive, which Cecil Beaton sold to Sotheby's in 1977.

Wine
In October 2019, Sotheby's launched Sotheby's Own Label Collection, a line of a dozen wines. The project took two years to complete, and is based on Sotheby's best-selling wines, both those represented in-store and on its e-commerce platform. Additionally, the collection reflects some of the long-standing relationships Sotheby's has with producers around the world. The Sotheby's Wine Encyclopedia has been published in several editions since 1988, written by Tom Stevenson.

Other

Sotheby's has produced a bimonthly online magazine since November–December 2018, Sotheby's Magazine.

Partners and subsidiaries

Sotheby's Institute of Art

In 1969, Sotheby's founded Sotheby's Institute of Art in London. The Institute now offers full-time accredited master's degrees as well as a range of online and other courses.

Sotheby's International Realty

Sotheby's International Realty is a luxury real estate brand founded in 1976 by Sotheby's. It operates as a franchise.

RM Sotheby's

RM Sotheby's deals in classic cars, headquartered in Canada with offices across the US and Europe. Formerly RM Auctions, the company has been part-owned by Sotheby's since 2015.

Sotheby’s Prize
The Sotheby's Prize, launched in 2017, is a $250,000 annual award given to museums that exhibit what are vaguely described as "groundbreaking shows". The inaugural winners were Many Tongues: Art, Language and Revolution in the Middle East and South Asia curated by Omer Kholeif of the Museum of Contemporary Art in Chicago and Pop América: Contesting Freedom, 1965–1975 curated by Esther Gabara of the Nasher Museum. The Sotheby's Prize program concluded in 2020, following a promise to honor existing commitments to shows that are still in formation.

Notable sales

Auctioned artwork 

Sotheby's has set, then later reset, a number of world records for auctioned works of art. The following monetary values are given in United States dollars.

 On 22 May 2002, Norman Rockwell's painting of Rosie the Riveter was sold for $4.96 million.
 On 3 May 2006, Sotheby's auctioned Pablo Picasso's Dora Maar au Chat for $95 million, becoming the second most expensive artwork ever sold at auction at that time.
 On 7 June 2007, a Roman-era bronze sculpture of Artemis and the Stag was sold at Sotheby's for $28.6 million, setting the new record as the most expensive sculpture as well as work from antiquity ever sold at auction at that time.
 Sotheby's holds the world record for most expensive piece of contemporary art ever sold at auction, with Mark Rothko's 1950 White Center (Yellow, Pink and Lavender on Rose), grossing $72.8 million in May 2007.
 Sotheby's set a new world record, at that time, for the most expensive auctioned work by a living artist, bringing in $17 million at a November 1986 auction of Out the Window by Jasper Johns, the first auction over $10 million in this category.
 While Sotheby's and Christie's surpassed each other over time, Sotheby's reclaimed the record with the first auction over $20 million in this category, Jeff Koons' Hanging Heart (Magenta/Gold), which grossed $23.6 million in a November 2007 sale.
 Sotheby's retook this record, at that time, on 12 October 2012, with the first auction over $30 million in this category, when a 1994 painting from the Abstraktes Bilder series by Gerhard Richter, Abstraktes Bild (809–4), was sold for $34 million.
 On 6 December 2007, Sotheby's auctioned the Guennol Lioness, a 3-inch limestone lion from ancient Mesopotamia. It is thought to be at least 5,000 years old. It was sold for $57 million, fetching the highest price ever paid for at an auction for a sculpture.
 On 15 December 2007, Sotheby's auctioned one of only seven copies of The Tales of Beedle the Bard, written by J. K. Rowling. The book was purchased for a hammer price of $3.8 million. Each leather bound copy was hand written and illustrated by Rowling, with six given to her close friends and the seventh sent to auction with proceeds going to The Children's Voice charity. 
 On 19 December 2007, Sotheby's auctioned a 710-year-old copy of the Magna Carta, the last remaining copy in private hands out of the 17 that are known to exist. The copy sold for $21.3 million.
 On 3 February 2010, the sculpture L'Homme qui marche I by Alberto Giacometti sold for $103.7 million at a London auction, at that time setting a new world record for a work of art sold at auction.
 On 2 May 2012, a version of the painting The Scream was sold for $119.9 million.
On 11 November 2014, the Patek Philippe Henry Graves Supercomplication became the most expensive watch ever sold at auction, reaching a final price of $23.98 million in Geneva.
 On 2 June 2016, Pablo Picasso's "Femme Assise" sold for $63.7 million at Sotheby's in London, making it the most expensive Cubist painting ever sold at auction.
On 5 October 2018, Banksy's "Girl with a Balloon" began to 'shred' itself shortly after hammering down at the artist's auction record. The work was later sold again with the new title "Love is in the Bin" for £18.5m, an artist's record for Banksy after the previous record of £16.5 million set in March that year.
 On 14 May 2019, Claude Monet's "Meules" was sold for over $110 million.
On 25 October 2021, Sotheby's auctioned 11 Picasso's previously belonging to Steve Wynn for $109 Million in a pop-up salesroom in Las Vegas.

Sneaker sales
In recent years, Sotheby's has been selling sneakers, both vintage designs in a "buy-now" sneaker shop, and high-value pairs, some worn by famous people, by auction. Sneaker auctions have brought in large numbers new to Sotheby's, from as young as 19 years old and across the world. Notable auction record-breaking sales include:
 July 2019, Nike 1972 Nike Waffle Racing Flat "Moon Shoe", 
 17 May 2020, Michael Jordan’s autographed Nike "Air Jordan 1"s from 1985 sold for 
 April 2021, Nike Air Yeezy 1 worn by Kanye West at the 2008 Grammy Awards, . They were bought by the specialist sneaker-investing platform RARES.

Jewelry
On 9 July 2021, Sotheby's sold a 101.38-carat diamond for $12.3 million in cryptocurrency. The sale became the most expensive physical object ever publicly offered for purchase with cryptocurrency at the time.

Controversies

Illegal antiquities

1990s scandal
In 1997, a Channel 4 Dispatches programme alleged that Sotheby's had been trading in antiquities with no published provenance, and that the organisation continued to use dealers involved in the smuggling of artefacts. From the late 1980s through to the early 1990s, the antiquities department in London was managed by Brendan Lynch and Oliver Forge. Lynch travelled to India frequently and bought unprovenanced pieces from Vaman Ghiya in Rajasthan, which turned out to be stolen from temples and other sites. British historian and journalist Peter Watson wrote Sotheby’s: The Inside Story (1997), outlining these illicit activities, which he also exposed on CBS’s 60 Minutes. As a result of this exposé, Sotheby's commissioned their own report into illegal antiquities, and made assurances that only legal items with published provenance would be traded in the future.  It ceased its regular Asian art sales in London said that they would henceforth only be selling Asian pieces from New York, where their legitimacy could be better monitored. Forge and Lynch were removed from their posts but never charged, and they opened a consultancy in London and continued to trade.

In India, Ghiya was eventually arrested in 2003, only convicted in 2008 and sentenced to life in prison; however, in 2014 an Indian High Court quashed the conviction. Some of the illicit Asian pieces found their way to the National Gallery of Australia, and from there a piece known as "Dancing Shiva" found its way to the Art Gallery of South Australia. After doubts were raised and the piece became the object of an investigation beginning in 2014, it was established that it was most likely a stolen piece, and was repatriated to India in 2019.

Cambodian statue (2012) 
In 2012, the U.S. Immigration and Customs Enforcement moved to seize a 10th-century Cambodian sandstone statue from Sotheby's, alleging in a civil complaint before the United States District Court for the Southern District of New York that the company had put the work up for auction "despite knowing that it had been stolen from a temple" in Koh Ker.

Price-fixing scandal (2000)
In February 2000, A. Alfred Taubman and Diana (Dede) Brooks, the CEO of the company, stepped down amidst a price fixing scandal. The FBI had been investigating auction practices in which it was revealed that collusion involving commission fixing between Christie's and Sotheby's was occurring. In October 2000, Brooks admitted her guilt in hopes of receiving a reduced sentence, implicating Taubman. In December 2001, jurors in a high-profile New York City courtroom found Taubman guilty of conspiracy. He served ten months of a one-year sentence in prison, while Brooks received a six-month home confinement and a penalty of US$350,000. Sotheby's was sentenced to pay a fine of US$45 million. No staff from Christie's were charged.

Growing out of the four-year criminal antitrust investigation by the United States Department of Justice, some 130,000 buyers and sellers filed class-action lawsuit, arguing they were cheated in the price-fixing conspiracy by Sotheby's and Christie's. In 2001, the United States District Court for the Southern District of New York gave final approval to a US$512 million agreement. The structure of the settlement was said to have helped stave off insolvency for both companies, especially the publicly held Sotheby's.

At the time of the scandal, 59 percent of the company's Class A shares were owned by Baron Funds.

Auction error (2011) 
On 10 March 2011, Sotheby's sold a pair of sconces incorrectly attributed to Emile-Jacques Ruhlmann.

Artists' authorship rights (2012)
In 2012, art dealer Marc Jancou filed suit in the Supreme Court of the State of New York, suing both Sotheby's and artist Cady Noland after the auction house pulled a work he had consigned by the artist from a sale, apparently at her request. The suit argued that this presented a breach of the consignment agreement. Noland had told Sotheby's there were problems with the condition of her painting Cowboys Milking (1990), estimated to sell for between US$260,000 and $350,000. Jancou sued Sotheby's for US$6 million in compensatory damages, and Noland for US$20 million in punitive damages. Both Sotheby's and Noland argued withdrawing the work from auction was well within the artist's rights under the Visual Artists Rights Act (VARA) and New York's Artists' Authorship Rights Act (AARA).

Industrial dispute (2015)
Sotheby's London auction house had outsourced its cleaning and other support services to Contract Cleaning and Maintenance (London) Limited (CCML). In early 2015, the UVW union initiated a formal trade dispute over low pay, insufficient sick pay, and issues summarised in an Early Day Motion signed by 24 Members of Parliament, highlighting:the unwarranted suspension of a porter following a grievance he made about poor treatment, the refusal to stop using certain chemicals which leave cleaners with breathing difficulties, chest pains and rashes, the unwarranted deduction of wages and working hours, overworking and shouting at porters and cleaners, reprimanding a porter for using the toilet outside his official break time, threatening a cleaner with suspension for not being clean shavenAfter CCML conceded the majority of UVW's demands, Sotheby's decided to contract all support services to a new company, Servest. This backfired when UVW staged a noisy, sit-down protest outside the Sotheby's entrance while clients arrived for a record-breaking summer night of contemporary art auctions, including lots by Andy Warhol and Francis Bacon. Four workers were suspended and investigated for their involvement in the protest, which led to another Early Day Motion signed by 42 MPs, condemning:that Sotheby's and Servest consider peaceful protest to be an act of misconduct; further condemns Sotheby's decision to ban from the site cleaners and porters who took part in a lawful, peaceful protest to call for a real Living Wage, contractual sick pay and an end to trade union victimisationWith only two of the four workers reinstated, another UVW protest disrupted a Sotheby's classic car auction in London's Battersea. In February 2016 it was announced that Sotheby's and Servest had reached an agreement to pay all outsourced workers the London Living Wage and improved sick pay.

Alleged misleading of traders (2016–2019)
In 2016, three New York art traders – Warren Adelson, president of Adelson Galleries, as well as New York-based art dealers Alexander Parish and Robert Simon – planned to sue Sotheby's for alleged fraud over the resale of Leonardo da Vinci's Salvator Mundi, which they sold through Sotheby's in 2013 for $80 million. After learning that the buyer of the painting, Swiss art dealer Yves Bouvier, sold it on to Russian billionaire Dmitry Rybolovlev for $127.5 million, the traders felt deceived by the auction house as to the painting's true value. According to court papers, the traders inquired whether Sotheby's knew the art work could have been sold for more, and whether they were "misled into selling the work for a smaller amount by Sotheby’s because Bouvier is an esteemed client." The auction house has denied knowing that Rybolovlev was the intended buyer, and sought to dismiss the lawsuit pre-emptively.

In a related development, Rybolovlev sued Sotheby's for $380 million in damages for this alleged collusion with Yves Bouvier in 2018, claiming the company "materially assisted the largest art fraud in history", due to Sotheby's vice chairman of private sales worldwide writing "bullish assessments, which Bouvier forwarded to Rybolovlev’s team, about some of the same artworks that Bouvier bought privately through Sotheby’s and flipped to the Russian at higher prices." Rybolovlev alleged that Yves Bouvier defrauded him out of $1 billion through this practice, over several years. Sotheby's dismissed these allegations as "entirely without merit" and stated it would seek to have the case thrown out.

However, on 25 June 2019, a US federal court denied Sotheby's request to have the case dismissed, arguing that "although there is parallel litigation ongoing in Switzerland, Sotheby’s fails to establish that there are 'exceptional circumstances' justifying dismissal." The court also issued an order for Sotheby's to submit all previously confidential information relating to the litigation and rejected the auction house's request to redact specific details from court documents. In a statement, Sotheby's called the court decision "disappointing" and stated it would "vigorously litigate the merits of the case in Switzerland and New York."

On 13 November 2019, the New York Court of Appeals upheld the decision, requiring Sotheby's to hand over the case relevant files. Sotheby's had argued that handing over the documents would breach confidentiality and insisted that because it was named in ongoing proceedings in Switzerland, it should "be shielded from orders to produce the documents," both of which the court rejected.

Activist investors

In 2013 and 2014, Sotheby's was the target of a takeover attempt by activist investor Daniel S. Loeb of Third Point LLC, a registered investment adviser founded in 1995 and headquartered in New York with over $14 billion in assets under management. Third Point began acquiring shares in Sotheby's in February 2013. By July 2013, Loeb's stake in Sotheby's increased to 3.7%, and in August he raised his stake to 5.7%, and requested to talk with the management and board. In July, activists at Marcato Capital Management revealed a 6.6% stake, saying that the shares were undervalued. At that point, Marcato and Third Point were Sotheby's second and third-largest shareholders, following BlackRock Fund Advisors. Third Point's August purchase brought its stake in Sotheby's to 3.9 million shares.

On 2 October, Third Point increased its share of Sotheby's to 9.3 percent and, in a letter to Sotheby's president, CEO, and Chairman William F. Ruprecht, called for a change in management, due to "the company's chronically weak operating margins and deteriorating competitive position relative to Christie's, as evidenced by each of the contemporary and modern art evening sales over the last several years." Loeb wanted the firm to expand globally and offered to "join the Board immediately and to help recruit several new directors".

On 3 October 2013, Sotheby's responded to Third Point's rapid accumulation of Sotheby's stock by announcing its adoption of a shareholder rights plan, known generally as a "poison pill", whereby it forcibly diluted investor holdings in an attempt to ward off a hostile takeover. Third Point described the action as "a disproportionate response" and "a relic from the 1980s".

Between October 2013 and February 2014, representatives of Sotheby's and Third Point "held a number of in-person and telephonic meetings" in which "they discussed Third Point’s ideas about how to increase stockholder value." At these meetings, Third Point insisted on multiple seats on Sotheby's board; the firm offered only a single seat for Loeb himself.

In February 2014, Third Point, which by now was Sotheby's largest stockholder, stated in a filing that it would nominate three people – Loeb, Harry Wilson, and Olivier Reza – to Sotheby's board, saying that current board members "lack the fresh perspective necessary to overhaul the company's challenged operational structure and cure its cultural malaise." Informing Sotheby's formally on 27 February 2014, of its nomination of Loeb, Wilson, and Reza as board candidates, Third Point commended Sotheby's for having taken certain actions that Third Point considered productive, but stated that "there remains much to be done to enhance" the firm's "competitive position, refocus its strategy, and boost stockholder value." It was reported in early March that Marcato would support Third Point's nominees to the board.

On 13 March, a day after Third Point increased its stake in Sotheby's slightly to 9.6%, the firm rejected Third Point's board nominees. Instead, the firm nominated executive Jessica Bibliowicz and former AOL and Univision executive Kevin Conroy.

2014: ISS recommendation
On 24 April 2014, the investor shareholder advisory firm Institutional Shareholder Services recommended that Sotheby's investors should vote for two of the three board members recommended by Daniel Loeb, including himself. The second board member recommended by the ISS was Olivier Reza, "a former investment banker whose jeweler family has done business with Sotheby's."

Prior to the ISS recommendation, on 21 April 2014, Mr. Loeb wrote a letter to the Sotheby's board noting the following:
We are convinced that having an owner's perspective in the boardroom yields better results, that this board is in dire need of fresh insights, and that our candidates are more qualified than the company's emissaries we are seeking to replace.

In the report the ISS noted that, "the particulars of their criticisms of things like commission margin, there is credible reason to believe their larger criticism about strategic myopia has some credibility". ISS recommended shareholders vote for Loeb and Olivier Reza and that introducing change into the boardroom was warranted. Writing for The New York Times on 24 April, of 2014, Alexandria Stevenson notes:
Mr. Loeb has accused Sotheby's of rebating the fees its takes for selling multimillion-dollar works, while also taking less of the buyer's fees to attract more business. He has taken issue with the auction house's strategy of focusing on top clients and headline sales. He has even criticized board members' relatively low holdings of their own company’s stock.

Later that day, Sotheby's issued a statement in regards to the report by the ISS:
We believe that Sotheby's shareholders should vote for all of Sotheby's director nominees. We note that ISS rejected one of Third Point's nominees and recommends that shareholders vote for our Say on Pay proposal.

On 5 May, Dan Loeb and Sotheby's reached an agreement which stipulated that Dan Loeb, Olivier Reza and Harry J. Wilson joined the board in exchange for Third Point having an ownership cap at 15%, William Ruprecht would stay as CEO and the proxy context to be held at Sotheby's AGM would cease On the newest board members, Bill Ruprecht, Chairman, President and CEO of Sotheby's noted:

We welcome our newest directors to the Board and look forward to working with them, confident that we share the common goal of delivering the greatest value to Sotheby's clients and shareholders. This agreement ensures that our focus is on the business and that we will benefit from five fresh voices and viewpoints.

2016: Taikang Life Insurance acquires largest stake 
Disclosed on 27 July 2016, Chinese insurance company Taikang Life Insurance, run by Chen Dongsheng, the grandson-in-law of Mao Zedong, bought a 13.5% stake in Sotheby's, holding the highest active stake of the auction house.

See also 
 Love is in the Bin, Banksy painting sold by Sotheby's in 2018 and then again in 2021
 Peter Wilson (auctioneer), former chairman
The Sotheby's Wine Encyclopedia

References

Further reading

 Includes bibliography.

External links 
 

 
London auction houses
Commercial buildings in Manhattan
Auction houses based in New York City
Canadian auction houses
Price fixing convictions
Retail companies established in 1744
2019 mergers and acquisitions
Companies formerly listed on the New York Stock Exchange
Upper East Side
Mayfair
1744 establishments in England